Sakurako Omoto (尾本桜子, Omoto Sakurako, is a Japanese field hockey player for the Japanese national team.

References

External links
 

1998 births
Living people
Japanese female field hockey players
Female field hockey midfielders
Field hockey players at the 2020 Summer Olympics
Olympic field hockey players of Japan